"Closer" is a song by Australian singer-songwriter, Michael Paynter, released physically and digitally as his debut single on 28 June 2008. The song was used in advertisements for the Seven Network's drama series, City Homicide. It was to be included on Paynter's debut album This Welcome Diversion, however its release was delayed and then cancelled by Sony after Paynter was dropped from the label. However, an acoustic version of the song was included on Paynter's free album Money on Your Tongue. "Closer" peaked at number sixty-one on the ARIA Singles Chart.

Track listing

Charts

See also
 Love the Fall

References

2008 singles
2008 songs
Michael Paynter songs
Sony Music Australia singles
Songs written by Gary Clark (musician)
Songs written by Michael Paynter